Nhooph Al-Areebi 
(born November 23, 1994) is a Canadian professional wrestler. She is currently signed to WWE, where she performs on the SmackDown brand under the ring name Aliyah. She is a former WWE Women's Tag Team Champion. She holds the record for the fastest victory in WWE history at 3.17 seconds. Al-Areebi is the first female Arab-Canadian wrestler to win a championship for WWE.

Early life 
Nhooph Al-Areebi was born in Toronto, Ontario. She is of Syrian and Iraqi descent. In 2012, she graduated from St. Joseph's College School, and later attended George Brown College, where she studied nursing. She also attended a circus training school.

Professional wrestling career

Independent circuit (2013–2015) 
Al-Areebi wrestled on the independent circuit under the ring name Jasmin Areebi, debuting for Squared Circle Wrestling (SCW) in Toronto in January 2013. She wrestled for a variety of promotions in Canada and the United States, including Pure Wrestling Association (PWA), Absolute Intense Wrestling (AIW), and New England Championship Wrestling (NECW).

WWE

NXT (2015–2021) 

On March 17, 2015, it was reported that Al-Areebi had signed a developmental contract with WWE. Her signing was confirmed by WWE on April 13. She made her first appearance at the NXT TakeOver: Unstoppable event on May 20, as part of Tyler Breeze's entrance. She made her in–ring debut on June 20 during an NXT live event, where she competed in a six–person tag team match. In October, she was given the ring name Aliyah.

Aliyah's television debut took place on the January 12, 2016, episode of NXT, where she competed in a number one contender's battle royal for Bayley's NXT Women's Championship, which was won by Carmella. On the April 27 episode of NXT, Aliyah competed in her first televised singles match, where she lost to Carmella. Towards the end of the year, Aliyah debuted new ring gear and entrance music, leaving her Arabian gimmick, and picked up her first victory as part of the brand, as she defeated Billie Kay after a distraction by Liv Morgan, only for both of them to be attacked by Kay and Peyton Royce. This set a six–woman tag team match between Aliyah, Morgan and Ember Moon against The Iconic Duo (Kay and Royce) and Daria Berenato, that was taped on NXT TakeOver: Toronto on November 19, where Aliyah's team was victorious.

On January 3, 2017, Aliyah made her first main roster appearance as she appeared on SmackDown Live, where she lost to Carmella. Throughout 2018, Aliyah continued losing to various competitors such as Lacey Evans, Ember Moon and Mae Young Classic winner Kairi Sane, while also showing signs of a heel turn. In September, Aliyah, now officially working as a heel, started a short alliance with Evans, and the two had an altercation with Dakota Kai and Deonna Purrazzo, which led to a tag team match, where Aliyah and Evans were victorious, making Aliyah's first victory in over a year.

After some time away, on the February 13, 2019, episode of NXT, Aliyah returned working full-time, as she defeated Taynara Conti after interference from Vanessa Borne. The duo then started an alliance and picked up their first victory against Conti and Xia Li, two weeks later on the February 27 episode. In mid November on an episode of NXT, Aliyah went up against Li in a losing effort, who had kayfabe injured Aliyah's nose in the process with a spin kick. This was done to write her off television, so that she could get cosmetic surgery on her nose. 

Aliyah returned to in-ring competition March 25, 2020, edition of NXT, where she lost to Io Shirai in a qualifying match. Aliyah had a match a few weeks later against Li in a losing effort. On the May 6 episode of NXT, she helped Chelsea Green get a victory over Li and tried to get on the Robert Stone Brand. The following week, on the May 13 episode of NXT, she tried to impress Stone in a match against Kayden Carter which she lost. When she tried to ask him if she could join his brand, he turned her down. Stone eventually changed his mind and officially joined forces with Aliyah on the June 17 episode of NXT, after he helped her get a victory over Xia Li. Aliyah and Stone would feud with Rhea Ripley as she lost to her on the June 24 episode of NXT. The following week on Night 1 of NXT: The Great American Bash, Aliyah competed alongside Stone against Ripley in a handicap match, with the stipulation that if Ripley lost then she would join the Robert Stone Brand, but they were defeated. On the July 13, 2021, episode of NXT, Aliyah turned on Stone after losing a tag team match with herself and Jessi Kamea versus Kacy Catanzaro and Kayden Carter.

SmackDown (2021–present) 
As part of the 2021 Draft, Aliyah was drafted to the SmackDown brand. Aliyah made her official main roster debut on the November 5 episode of SmackDown, where she participated in a backstage segment with Jeff Hardy and Sami Zayn. The following week, on the November 12 episode of SmackDown, Aliyah would have her debut match with the brand, competing as a face and teaming with Naomi and Sasha Banks to defeat Shotzi, Shayna Baszler and Natalya. Later that same night, Sonya Deville removed her from the SmackDown Survivor Series team without explanation. She was eventually replaced by Toni Storm. In January, Aliyah would defeat Natalya, in 3.17 seconds, earning her the record for fastest victory in WWE history. At Royal Rumble, Aliyah competed in the 30-woman Royal Rumble match which was won by Ronda Rousey. On the August 29 edition of Raw, Aliyah and Raquel Rodriguez defeated Dakota Kai and Iyo Sky (formerly Io Shirai) to win the vacant WWE Women's Tag Team Championship, her first championship in WWE. Although it was later seen that she pinned Dakota Kai who was not the legal competitor, nonetheless her team was still crowned champions. On the September 12 episode of Raw they lost the titles to Dakota Kai and Iyo Sky, ending their reign at 14 days.

Personal life 
Al-Areebi first decided she wanted to become a wrestler after watching Beth Phoenix and Mickie James compete at a taping of Raw on May 5, 2008. Her favorite wrestlers include Edge and Jeff Hardy.

Championships and accomplishments 

 Ground Xero Wrestling
 GXW Women's Championship (1 time)
 Great Canadian Wrestling
 GCW Women's Championship (1 time)
 Queens of Chaos
 World Queens of Chaos Championship (1 time)
 Pure Wrestling Association 
 PWA Women's Championship (1 time)
 Southland World Wrestling
SWW Ladies Championship (1 time)
SWW Women's Championship (2 times, final)
 World Wrestling Entertainment (WWE) 
WWE Women's Tag Team Championship (1 time) – with Raquel Rodriguez
 WWE Women’s Tag Team Championship Tournament (2022) - with  Raquel Rodriguez

References

External links 

 
 

1994 births
Canadian female professional wrestlers
Female models from Ontario
Canadian expatriate professional wrestlers in the United States
Living people
Professional wrestlers from Toronto
Canadian people of Arab descent
Canadian people of Iraqi descent
Canadian people of Syrian descent
21st-century professional wrestlers
WWE Women's Tag Team Champions